The African collared dove (Streptopelia roseogrisea) is a small dove found in the Sahel, northern parts of the Horn of Africa and southwestern Arabia. Although it lives in arid lands, it is found around water sources.

Its upper body, from shoulders to tail, is a pale grayish brown, though the wing edge has a bluish tinge. Flight feathers are darker, and nearly black. Head, neck and breast are pinkish shading to white on the chin and belly. There is little sexual dimorphism.

The African collared dove is the species thought to be the wild ancestor of the domestic Barbary dove, though some suggest the Eurasian collared dove (Streptopelia decaocto) may also have been involved. The African collared dove is able to hybridise with the Barbary dove, and it is thought that the increase in the range of colours of Barbary doves available that occurred in the later 20th century was the result of the importation of African collared doves into the United States for interbreeding.

It is reported to have been introduced into New Zealand, but it is more likely that the birds there are descended from domestic Barbary doves.

References

External links 

 The Cornell Lab of Ornithology, All About Birds

African collared dove
African collared dove
Birds of the Sahel
Birds of the Middle East
African collared dove